Life Begins at Eighty is an American panel discussion television series which aired from January 1950 to February 1956.

Broadcast history
The show first aired on NBC on January 13, 1950, then on DuMont from March 21, 1952, to July 24, 1955, and finally on ABC. The last show was aired on ABC on February 25, 1956. In its ABC run, Life Begins at Eighty was aired opposite two anthology series, Appointment with Adventure on CBS and The Loretta Young Show on NBC. Prior to its television run, the show began on radio in 1948.

The show was hosted by Jack Barry, and consisted of viewers at home writing questions for the octogenarian panel to answer. There were usually four panelists; the two permanent spots on the panel were given to Broadway actress Georgiana Carhart, and Fred Stein, cousin of writer and poet Gertrude Stein.

Life Begins at Eighty was a spin-off of the popular panel discussion series Juvenile Jury, in which young children answered questions from the viewers at home. The panels were combined in Wisdom of the Ages, which ran on DuMont from December 1952 to June 1953.

The series was parodied in a Sesame Street game show sketch starring Guy Smiley titled, Happiness Begins at 40.

Episode status
One episode is in the collection of the Paley Center for Media, and two episodes are held in the J. Fred MacDonald collection at the Library of Congress.

See also
List of programs broadcast by the DuMont Television Network
List of surviving DuMont Television Network broadcasts

Bibliography
David Weinstein, The Forgotten Network: DuMont and the Birth of American Television (Philadelphia: Temple University Press, 2004) 
Alex McNeil, Total Television, Fourth edition (New York: Penguin Books, 1980) 
Tim Brooks and Earle Marsh, The Complete Directory to Prime Time Network TV Shows, Third edition (New York: Ballantine Books, 1964)

External links
Life Begins at Eighty at IMDB
DuMont historical website

American Broadcasting Company original programming
DuMont Television Network original programming
NBC original programming
1950 American television series debuts
1956 American television series endings
Television series by Barry & Enright Productions
1940s American radio programs
1940s American game shows
1950s American game shows
Mutual Broadcasting System programs
ABC radio programs
Black-and-white American television shows